"But for the Grace of God" is a song co-written and recorded by Australian country music singer Keith Urban. Urban wrote the song along with Charlotte Caffey and Jane Wiedlin of The Go-Go's. It was released in November 2000 as the third single from his self-titled American debut album. The song became Urban's first number one hit on the US Billboard Hot Country Singles & Tracks chart for the week of February 24, 2001, and maintained that position for one week. This ended a two-and-a-half-year streak in which no artist on the Capitol Records label achieved a Number One single on the country charts.

Single and album version differences
Both radio edit and album-length versions have been issued. The radio edit excises a musical bridge after the second chorus and has a slightly different ending than the album cut.

Music video
The music video for this song was directed by Trey Fanjoy, and premiered on CMT on December 2, 2000. It features Urban walking down a busy street at night.

Chart positions

Year-end charts

Notes

References

2000 singles
Keith Urban songs
Music videos directed by Trey Fanjoy
Songs written by Charlotte Caffey
Songs written by Keith Urban
Songs written by Jane Wiedlin
Capitol Records Nashville singles
1999 songs